François Labourie (born 15 December 1960) is a French mathematician who has made various contributions to geometry, including pseudoholomorphic curves, Anosov diffeomorphism, and convex geometry. In a series of papers with Yves Benoist and Patrick Foulon, he solved a conjecture on Anosov's flows in compact contact manifolds.

He was educated at the École Normale Supérieure and Paris Diderot University, where he earned his Ph.D. under supervision of Mikhail Gromov. In 1992 he was awarded one of the inaugural prizes of the European Mathematical Society. In 1998 he was an Invited Speaker of the International Congress of Mathematicians in Berlin.

References

External links

Curriculum Vitae

1960 births
Living people
École Normale Supérieure alumni
20th-century French mathematicians
21st-century French mathematicians
University of Paris alumni
French geometers